Jiahe is a metro station of Zhengzhou Metro Line 2. It currently serves as the northern terminus of Line 2.

Station layout  
The 2-level underground station has two side platforms and two concourses. The station concourses and the platforms are on the B1 level and the B2 level is a tunnel connecting two concourses.

Exits

References 

Stations of Zhengzhou Metro
Line 2, Zhengzhou Metro
Railway stations in China opened in 2019